Lake Conjola is a small town situated on the South Coast of New South Wales, Australia. It is located in the region of Ulladulla, in the City of Shoalhaven. Lake Conjola is a popular tourist destination for boaters and fisherman. Fish in the lake include bream, whiting, tailor, flathead, luderick and jewfish. Lake Conjola is located on the southern side of Green Island, a renowned surf break. There are 4 caravan parks with cabins, caravan areas, tent areas, and waterfronts.

On New Year's Eve in 2019 the town was affected by fire during the 2019–20 Australian bushfire season. Eight-nine homes were lost in nearby Conjola Park.

Population
In the 2016 Census, there were 437 people in Lake Conjola. 81.6% of people were born in Australia and 90.8% of people spoke only English at home. The most common responses for religion were Anglican 34.6% and No Religion 25.7%.

See also 

 Conjola National Park

References

Towns in the South Coast (New South Wales)
City of Shoalhaven